Waipā District Council is the territorial authority for the Waipā District of New Zealand.

The council consists of 14 elected members: the mayor of Waipā, and 13 ward councillors.

Composition

Councillors

 Mayor: 
 Cambridge Ward: Liz Stolwyk, Mike Pettit, Philip Coles, Roger Gordon, Grahame Webber
 Te Awamutu Ward: Lou Brown, Andrew Brown, Hazel Barnes, Marcus Gower
 Pirongia Ward: Clare St Pierre, Bruce Thomas
 Maungatautari Ward: Elwyn Andree-Wiltens
 Kakepuku Ward: Susan O'Regan

Community boards

 Cambridge Community Board: Sue Milner, Elise Badger, Jo Davies-Colley, Alana MacKay, Jim Goddin, Mike Montgomerie
 Te Awamutu Community Board: Gary Derbyshire, Richard Hurrell, Ange Holt, Jill Taylor, Kane Titchener

History

The council was established in 1989, through the merger of Waipa County Council, Cambridge Borough Council (established in 1886), and Te Awamutu Borough Council (established in 1915).

References

External links

 Official website

Waipa District
Politics of Waikato
Territorial authorities of New Zealand